Evelyn Mary Carnegie (born 8 December 1967) is an Irish academic and former association football player, who represented the Republic of Ireland women's national football team. She is Head of the Sport and Physical Activity Department at Edge Hill University.

In September 1992, Carnegie played for Ireland in their 10–0 UEFA Women's Euro 1993 qualification defeat by Sweden. She later represented the Liverpool County Football Association.

References

Living people
Republic of Ireland women's association footballers
Republic of Ireland women's international footballers
1967 births
Irish women academics
Alumni of Ulster University
Academics of Edge Hill University
Women's association football defenders